St. Ann's Federation Building is a historic commercial and office building located at Hornell in Steuben County, New York.  It is a rectangular shaped, four story Neoclassical style building built between 1910 and 1912.  The architect was Otis Dockstader of Elmira. The fireproof steel frame is clad in red and yellow brick laid up in running bond above a poured concrete foundation.  The first story is composed of plate glass storefronts flanking a central entrance.  The second floor contains a two-story, 73 by 60 feet auditorium, and dance hall.

It was listed on the National Register of Historic Places in 2001.

References

Commercial buildings on the National Register of Historic Places in New York (state)
Neoclassical architecture in New York (state)
Commercial buildings completed in 1912
Office buildings completed in 1912
Office buildings on the National Register of Historic Places in New York (state)
Buildings and structures in Steuben County, New York
1912 establishments in New York (state)
National Register of Historic Places in Steuben County, New York
Hornell, New York